tert-Butylphosphaacetylene is an organophosphorus compound.  Abbreviated t-BuCP, it was the first example of an isolable phosphaalkyne. Prior to its synthesis, the double bond rule had suggested that elements of Period 3 and higher were unable to form double or triple bonds with lighter main group elements because of weak orbital overlap.  The synthesis of t-BuCP discredited much of the double bond rule and opened new studies into the formation of unsaturated phosphorus compounds.

Synthesis and reactions
The synthesis of t-BuCP entails the reaction of pivaloyl chloride and P(SiMe3)3.  The reaction proceeds via the intermediacy of a bis(trimethylsilyl)pivaloylphosphine, which undergoes a 1,3-silyl shift to form E- or Z-phosphoalkene isomers.  Carrying out the phosphoalkene reaction at 120-200 °C in the presence of catalytic amounts of solid NaOH forms the final t-BuCP product. 
Me3CC(O)Cl  +  P(SiMe3)3   →   Me3CC(O)P(SiMe3)2  +  Me3SiCl
Me3CC(O)P(SiMe3)2   →   Me3CCP  +  O(SiMe3)2

Other phosphaalkynes
Phosphaalkynes possessing a C≡P bonded to bulky aryl groups are also known, e.g.  Mes*C≡P and P≡C(Tript)C≡P are known to possess C≡P bond lengths of 1.516  and 1.532 Å, respectively (see below).  While t-BuCP possesses a carbon-phosphorus bond length of 1.536 Å and a first ionization potential (π MO) of 9.70eV, H-C≡P possesses a C≡P bond length of 1.5421Å and a first ionization potential (π MO) of 10.79eV.

 
These physical properties produce characteristic reactivity differences between the two species: tert-butylphosphaacetylene is a stable volatile liquid (b.p. 61 °C), and phosphaacetylene readily reacts to form elemental phosphorus.  
It has been proposed that isophosphaalkynes (R-P≡C) are produced as intermediates during the syntheses of phosphaalkynes.  Such isomeric species have never been isolated.

Reactions
With their characteristic C-P triple bonds, the phosphorus atoms of phosphaalkynes such as tert-butylphosphaacetylene exhibit reactivities similar to nitriles, despite the significant differences between the radii of P (1.09 Å) and N (0.71 Å).  At temperatures above 130 °C, the phosphaalkyne undergoes cyclotetramerization. To some extent its reactivity more closely resembles the reactions of alkynes.

tert-Butylphosphaacetylene can bind to metals via various coordination modes to give inorganic and organometallic complexes.  These complexes utilize either the triple bond or the nonbonding electrons on P.

The higher electronegativity of carbon (2.5) over phosphorus (2.2) leads to polarized Cδ−≡Pδ+ bonds, which induces protonation at its carbon center.   Its variety of coordination geometries enable tert-butylphosphaacetylene to participate in several types of reactions, including 1,2-additions of halogenated compounds.

Organolithium compounds and enophiles can also react with C-P triple bonds, along with [2+1], [2+2], [2+3], and [2+4] cycloadditions. tert-Butylphosphaacetylene also undergoes a homo Diels-Alder cycloaddition reaction.

References

Organophosphorus compounds
Tert-butyl compounds